Mitch Jacobson (born 1963) is an American producer/director, video editor and educator specializing in multi-camera production.

Early life and education
Jacobson attended the film program at the University of South Florida in Tampa, Florida. He then worked at a public access television station in Tampa, and as a freelance director/cameraman for a decade.

Career

Multi-camera editing
Jacobson is an editor who has cut feature-length concert films and short-form publicity programs for numerous musicians including the Rolling Stones, Aerosmith, Paul McCartney and U2. He has produced and directed NFL and MLB programming for Fox Sports Channel, and edited comedy, music and awards shows for MTV. Paul McCartney Live In St. Petersburg, which he edited, was nominated for a 2006 Primetime Emmy Award for Outstanding Variety, Music or Comedy Special, and it was featured on the DVD Paul McCartney Live in Red Square, which won the MIPCOM Award for best music DVD of the Year. Paul McCartney: The Space Within Us is the largest multi-camera show Jacobson has edited, with 26 unique camera angles. He has also edited for numerous television shows, including Great Performances on PBS from 2008 to 2010, the Montel Williams Show from 2007 to 2008, America's Got Talent season 7 on NBC in 2012, Nick Cannon Presents: Wild 'N Out on MTV2 in 2013, and The Wendy Williams Show since 2011.

He is the owner of Category Five Studios, a creative editing and color boutique in New York City, and a member of the Motion Pictures Editors Guild.

Teaching
Jacobson is an Apple Certified Pro and trainer for the NewTek TriCaster multi-camera production system. He specializes in Avid, Final Cut Pro, Adobe Premiere Pro and NewTek TriCaster systems. He regularly presents multi-camera live stream, editing, directing and encoding workshops called StreamCamp across the US, for industry trade groups and conferences. In 2011, he began hosting Cutting It Close, a live web talk show for editors.

Jacobson's textbook Mastering MultiCamera Techniques was published by Focal Press in 2010. Intended for producers, directors and editors, it has information on multi-camera productions from a 2-camera interview to a 26-camera concert, and includes a DVD tutorial with multiple angle concert footage from Paul McCartney and Elton John. The book's foreword was written by Academy Award-winning editor Thomas A. Ohanian, formerly of Avid Technology.

Filmography

Television
 The Reppies – editor, 2 episodes, 1996
 The 5th Wheel – editor, 1 episode, 2002
 60 Minutes on Classic – editor, 7 episodes, 2004
 House of Dreams – post producer, 2004
 Isaac (Style Network) – editor, 2005–06
 Get Fresh with Sara Snow – editor, 2007
 Rachael Ray – editor, 1 episode, 2007
 The Montel Williams Show – editor, 33 episodes, 2007–08
 SundayArt News – editor, 10 episodes, 2009
 Rising: Rebuilding Ground Zero (Discovery Channel) – editor, 1 episode, 2011
 The Wendy Williams Show – editor, 14 episodes, 2011–14
 America's Got Talent (NBC) – editor, 12 episodes, 2012
 Annie's Search for Sandy – editor, 2012
 The Chew (ABC) – editor, 6 episodes, 2012
 MTVU Woodies Awards 2013 (MTVU) – editor,  2013
 O Music Awards (Viacom) – technical director, 2013
 Nick Cannon Presents: Wild 'N Out (MTV2) – editor, 12 episodes, 2013
 Guy Court (MTV2) – editor, 3 episodes, 2013
 Girl Code (MTV) – editor, 4 episodes, 2013–14

Concert films
 Music Choice OnStage Featuring the Barenaked Ladies – producer, director, editor, 2000
 New Sound Lounge –producer, director, editor, 2001
 Paul McCartney: Live in St. Petersburg – editor, colorist, 2003
 Aerosmith: You Gotta Move – field producer, editor, 2004
 Keith Urban: The Road to Be Here – editor, 2004
 Paul McCartney Backstage at Super Bowl XXXIX – editor, 2005
 Newport Jazz Festival – producer, editor, 2005
 Paul McCartney: The Space Within Us – post producer, editor, 2006
 Great Performances – editor, 3 episodes (Stevie Wonder, Eric Clapton and Steve Winwood, and Pavarotti), 2007–09
 Aimee Mann: Live from the Artists Den (TV series) – editor, 2008
 Ben Harper: Live from the Artists Den – editor, 2008
 U2: 360 Degrees at the Rose Bowl – additional editor, 2010
 Rufus Wainwright: Live from the Artists Den – editor, 2012
 Kid Rock: Live from the Artists Den – editor, 2012

Bibliography

Books
 Mastering MultiCamera Techniques: From Preproduction to Editing and Deliverables (Focal Press, 2010)

Articles
 "Multicam Madness!" – Creative COW, 2010 
 "Live on the Net Without a Net: Cutting Live" – Creative COW, 2012

References

External links
 Category Five Studios website

1963 births
Living people
American film editors
Film producers from New York (state)
Television video editors
People from Chicago
Artists from New York City
Film producers from Illinois